I am à l'ancienne is the debut and first solo album from R&B singer/rapper K.Maro. The album is produced by DJ Short Cut, and includes "Le clan chill" featuring Corneille. Also very notable is "Symphonie pour un dingue" in two versions (original and remix) and written by Louis Côté who later on composed K. Maro's most successful song "Femme Like U". The remix version of "Symphonie pour un dingue"  was done on a Sonny Black beat used in Corneille et Kulcha Connexion hits.

Track listing
"Symphonie pour un dingue"
"I am a l'ancienne"
"Le clan chill"
"La maline"
"C'est mon commerce"
"La peste"
"So hot"
"Balbec dansant"
"Bouge tes fesses"
"Lady's night"
"Le thon, la brute et le puant"
"Mon vibe"
"More than music"
"Symphonie pour un dingue (remix)"

2002 debut albums
K.Maro albums
French-language albums